The anime series Tenjho Tenge was directed by Toshifumi Kawase, animated by Madhouse, and produced by TV Asahi and Avex Mode, the animation division of the Avex group of companies. The twenty-four episodes were originally aired weekly on TV Asahi in Japan on Thursdays from April 1, 2004, to September 16, 2004. These episodes were made into eight-volume DVD box sets. Two additional episodes were broadcast by TV Asahi in Japan on March 16, 2005, and released in the form of an original video animation named Tenjho Tenge: Ultimate Fight. The anime follows closely to its source material up to the manga's eighth volume with the exception of the sexual content which was toned down. The anime has been dubbed into English, French, German and the Tagalog language. The anime series has been licensed for the English language by Geneon Entertainment, and has released all episodes except the DVD special named Tenjho Tenge: The Past Chapter, which is the back-story told through flashbacks in the second half of the anime television series condensed into the size of four episodes. The series was broadcast in the United States by the cable channel Fuse.

Episode list

OVAs

References

External links

Tenjho Tenge
Episodes